Nala is a community development block that forms an administrative division in the Jamtara Sadar subdivision of the Jamtara district, Jharkhand state, India. It is located 27 km from Jamtara, the district headquarters.

Geography

Jamtara district in the south-eastern part of Santhal Parganas is a rolling upland tract. The Barakar separates it from the Chota Nagpur plateau and the Ajay, flows in from Deoghar district in the west, drains the district, forms the border between Jharkhand and West Bengal for some distance and flows into West Bengal in the east.

Nala CD block is bounded by Fatehpur CD block on the north, Kundhit CD block and Khoyrasol CD block in Birbhum district, West Bengal, on the east, Jamuria, Barabani and Salanpur CD blocks in Paschim Bardhaman district, West Bengal, on the south, and Jamtara CD block on the west.

Nala CD block has an area of 416.67 km2.Nala police station serves this block. Headquarters of this CD block is at Nala village.

Nala CD block has 23 panchayats and 251 villages.

Panchayats of Nala CD block are: Afjalpur, Bandardiha, Bararampur, Chaknayapara, Dalabar, Dhobna, Futberia, Geriya, Jamdehi, Kasta, Khaira, Kuldangal, Maheshmunda, Mahulbana, Moralo, Morbasa, Nala, Paikbarh, Pakuria, Panjunia, Saluka, Sripur and Tesjoriya.

Demographics

Population
As per the 2011 Census of India Nala CD block had a total population of 134,780, all of which were rural. There were 68,771 (51%) males and 66,009 (49%) females. Population below 6 years was 20,014. Scheduled Castes numbered 16,718 (12.40%) and Scheduled Tribes numbered 48,626 (36.08%).

Literacy
 census, the total number of literates in Nala CD Block was 74,171 (64.63% of the population over 6 years) out of which 44,655 (60%) were males and 29,516 (40%) were females. The gender disparity (the difference between female and male literacy rates) was 20%.

See also – List of Jharkhand districts ranked by literacy rate

Language and religion
In 2001, the present-day Jamtara district was a part of Dumka district. In 2001, Santali was the mother-tongue of 660,233 persons in Dumka district, forming 41.17% of the population, followed by Hindi with 615,667 persons (38.39%) and Bengali with 327,714 persons (20.44%). (percentages have been re-calculated on the basis of data provided in the Census Handbook).

Hindi is the official language in Jharkhand and Urdu has been declared as an additional official language.

In 2011, Hindus numbered 550,560, forming 69.60% of the population of Jamtara district followed by Muslims with 164,406 persons (20.78%) and Christians with 4,419 persons (0.96%).

Rural poverty
60-70% of the population of Jamtara district were in the BPL category in 2004–2005, being in the same category as Ranchi and Dumka districts. Rural poverty in Jharkhand declined from 66% in 1993–94 to 46% in 2004–05. In 2011, it has come down to 39.1%.

Economy

Livelihood

In Nala CD block in 2011, amongst the class of total workers, cultivators numbered 18,501 and formed 34.33%, agricultural labourers numbered 23,698 and formed 43.97%, household industry workers numbered 2,279 and formed 4.23% and other workers numbered 9,412 and formed 17.47%.  Total workers numbered 53,890 and formed 39.98% of the total population. Non-workers numbered 80,890 and formed  60.02% of total population.

Note: In the census records a person is considered a cultivator, if the person is engaged in cultivation/ supervision of land owned. When a person who works on another person's land for wages in cash or kind or share, is regarded as an agricultural labourer. Household industry is defined as an industry conducted by one or more members of the family within the household or village, and one that does not qualify for registration as a factory under the Factories Act. Other workers are persons engaged in some economic activity other than cultivators, agricultural labourers and household workers.  It includes factory, mining, plantation, transport and office workers, those engaged in business and commerce, teachers and entertainment artistes.

Infrastructure
There are 242 inhabited villages in Nala CD block. In 2011, 112 villages had power supply. 5 villages had tap water (treated/ untreated), 217 villages had well water (covered/ uncovered), 236 villages had hand pumps, and all villages had drinking water facility. 20 villages had post offices, 18 villages had sub post offices, 23 villages had telephones (land lines), 21 villages had public call offices and 99 villages had mobile phone coverage. 239 villages had pucca (paved) village roads, 36 villages had bus service (public/ private), 6 villages had railway stations, 10 villages had autos/ modified autos, and 32 villages had tractors. 12 villages had bank branches, 7 villages had agricultural credit societies, 9 villages had cinema/ video halls, 3 villages had public library and public reading rooms. 71 villages had public distribution system, 23 villages had weekly haat (market) and 82 villages had assembly polling stations.

Backward Regions Grant Fund
Jamtara district is listed as a backward region and receives financial support from the Backward Regions Grant Fund.  The fund created by the Government of India is designed to redress regional imbalances in development. As of 2012, 272 districts across the country were listed under this scheme. The list includes 21 districts of Jharkhand.

Transportation
The Ajay forms the border between Jamtara district of Jharkhand and Bardhaman district of West Bengal. There is a bridge at Runakura Ghat. It connects to NH 19 (old numbering NH 2), Asansol city (29 km from Nala) and the collieries around Asansol.

Education
Nala CD block had 19 villages with pre-primary schools, 194 villages with primary schools, 82 villages with middle schools, 13 villages with secondary schools, 8 villages with senior secondary schools, 1 village with general degree college, 47 villages with no educational facility.
.*Senior secondary schools are also known as Inter colleges in Jharkhand

Degree College, affiliated with Sido Kanhu Murmu University, was established in 1988 at Nala.

Healthcare
Nala CD block had 1 village with community health centre, 5 villages with primary health centres, 5 villages with primary health subcentres, 1 village with maternity and child welfare centre, 1 Village with allopathic hospital, 1 village with dispensary, 1 village with veterinary hospital, 2 villages with family welfare centres, 5 villages with medicine shops.
.*Private medical practitioners, alternative medicine etc. not included

NGO working in Nala block
SANMAT : A Chennai Based NGO/Civil Society named Sanmat working on public health issues & community health. Sanmat is also taking care of MESO Hospital,Nala by providing operation & management support to ITDA. Another program which is being run by Sanmat is to train different SHG and villagers to turn them to economically empowered by creating village level entrepreneurs. Sanmat is also supporting Jharkhand Skill Development Mission as Training Partner.

References

Community development blocks in Jamtara district